"Thubway Tham's Thanksgiving Dinner" is a short story written by Johnston McCulley. It first appeared in Detective Story Magazine on November 26, 1918.

External links

American short stories
1918 short stories
Crime short stories
Works originally published in Detective Story Magazine